Itataya Ko ang Buhay Ko is a 1996 Philippine action film co-written and directed by Jose N. Carreon. The film stars Rudy Fernandez and Dawn Zulueta.

Cast
 Rudy Fernandez as Capt. Edmond Rosario
 Dawn Zulueta as Andrea Serrano
 Pia Pilapil as Rebecca
 Ricky Davao as Cesar Padua
 Mat Ranillo III as Lt. Torres
 Mark Gil as Capt. Lucban
 Charito Solis as Edmond's Mother
 Lito Legaspi as Col. Sabino
 Bob Soler as Rivero
 CJ Ramos as Junjun
 Melissa de Leon as Edmond's Wife
 Ramil Rodriguez as Maj. Lizares
 Kirby de Jesus as Edmond's Son

References

External links

1996 films
1996 action films
Filipino-language films
Philippine action films
Seiko Films films